A list of notable politicians of the Democratic Party of Italy:

A
Marisa Abbondanzieri
Nicola Adamo
Mauro Agostini
Giuliano Amato
Alfonso Andria
Salvo Andò
Giuseppe Ayala

B
Augusto Barbera
Franco Bassanini
Antonio Bassolino
Giorgio Benvenuto
Luigi Berlinguer
Rita Bernardini
Pier Luigi Bersani
Giovanni Bianchi
Enzo Bianco
Gerardo Bianco
Rosy Bindi
Paola Binetti
Guido Bodrato
Rita Borsellino
Mercedes Bresso
Claudio Burlando

C
Massimo Cacciari
Massimo Calearo
Salvatore Cardinale
Pierre Carniti
Salvatore Caronna
Patrizia Casagrande Esposto
Pierluigi Castagnetti
Luca Ceriscioli
Sergio Chiamparino
Carlo Azeglio Ciampi
Graziano Cioni
Giuseppe Civati
Luigi Cocilovo
Sergio Cofferati
Tommaso Coletti
Paola Concia
Rosario Crocetta
Gianni Cuperlo

D
Massimo D'Alema
Luciano D'Alfonso
Sergio D'Antoni
Pier Giorgio Dall'Acqua
Cesare Damiano
Ciriaco De Mita
Ottaviano Del Turco
Flavio Delbono
Lorenzo Dellai
Graziano Delrio
Bruno Dettori
Leonardo Domenici

E
Michele Emiliano
Vasco Errani

F
Piero Fassino
Massimo Federici
Emanuele Fiano
Anna Finocchiaro
Giuseppe Fioroni
Maurizio Fistarol
Marco Follini
Marco Formentini
Dario Franceschini
Franco Frigo

G
Paolo Gentiloni
Roberto Giachetti
Paolo Giaretta
Giuseppe Giulietti
Donata Gottardi
Lilli Gruber
Roberto Gualtieri

I
Rosa Russo Iervolino

K
Giovanni Kessler

L
Linda Lanzillotta
Vincenzo Lavarra
Enrico Letta
Massimo Livi Bacci
Maria Rita Lorenzetti
Andrea Losco
Giuseppe Lumia

M
Antonio Maccanico
Marianna Madia
Enrico Manca
Nicola Mancino
Luigi Manconi
Pietro Marcenaro
Catiuscia Marini
Franco Marini
Ignazio Marino
Piero Marrazzo
Sergio Mattarella
Giovanna Melandri
Virginio Merola
Maurizio Migliavacca
Marco Minniti
Alessia Mosca

O
Mario Oliverio
Rosario Olivo
Andrea Orlando

P
Pier Antonio Panzeri
Arturo Parisi
Giovanni Pellegrino
Giuseppe Pericu
Claudio Petruccioli
Pina Picierno
Roberta Pinotti
Lapo Pistelli
Gianni Pittella
Barbara Pollastrini
Giovanni Procacci
Romano Prodi
Vittorio Prodi

R
Piero Rebaudengo
Matteo Renzi
Sergio Reolon
Stefano Rodotà
Ettore Rosato
Francesco Rutelli

S
Guido Sacconi
Cataldo Salerno
Giulio Santagata
Riccardo Sarfatti
Luciana Sbarbati
Oscar Luigi Scalfaro
Ivan Scalfarotto
Marina Sereni
Achille Serra
Renato Soru
Gian Mario Spacca
Gianluca Susta

T
Patrizia Toia
Jean-Léonard Touadi
Livia Turco

V
Guglielmo Vaccaro
Achille Variati
Walter Veltroni
Donato Veraldi
Gianni Vernetti
Umberto Veronesi
Marta Vincenzi
Luciano Violante
Vincenzo Visco

Z
Mauro Zani
Flavio Zanonato
Valerio Zanone

Democratic Party of Italy